Goodbye Youth (Italian:Addio, giovinezza!) may refer to:

 Goodbye Youth (play), a 1911 work by Nino Oxilia and Sandro Camasio
 Goodbye Youth (1918 film), an Italian silent film 
 Goodbye Youth (1927 film), an Italian silent film 
 Goodbye Youth (1940 film), an Italian film